Alfaz Uddin is a Bangladesh Nationalist Party politician and the former Member of Parliament of Comilla-19.

Career
Uddin was elected to parliament from Comilla-19 as a Bangladesh Nationalist Party candidate in 1979.

Death
Uddin died on 15 July 2018.

References

Bangladesh Nationalist Party politicians
1932 births
2018 deaths
2nd Jatiya Sangsad members
Comilla Victoria Government College alumni